Collymore v Attorney General [1969] UKPC 11 is a case of the Privy Council relevant for UK labour law, concerning the right to strike.

Facts 
Collymore and other trade union members for oil companies claimed that a new Industrial Stabilisation Act 1965 in Trinidad and Tobago was ultra vires the constitution, which guaranteed freedom of association. The Act required no strikes pending binding arbitration.

Judgment 
The Privy Council advised that the Act did not breach the Constitution. Lord Donovan said the following:

See also 

United Kingdom labour law

Notes

References 

Ultra vires doctrin

Supremacy of the constitution

Rule of Law

Separation of Powers

External links 
Bailii.org British and Irish Legal Information Institute, accessed 17 March 2018

United Kingdom enterprise case law